The Platino Award for Film and Education Values (Spanish: Premio Platino a Cine y Educación en Valores) is one of the Platino Awards, Ibero-America's film awards, presented by the Entidad de Gestión de Derechos de los Productores Audiovisuales (EGEDA) and the Federación Iberoamericana de Productores Cinematográficos y Audiovisuales (FIPCA). 

The category was first awarded at the 4th Platino Awards in 2017. According to the Platino Awards website, the category is destined to recognize films that "promote the reflection of certain social and human values, that are considered positive for society as a whole, such as solidarity, fellowship, integrity, among others".

In the list below the winner of the award for each year is shown first, followed by the other nominees.

Awards and nominations

2010s

2020s

References

Platino Awards
Documentary film awards